The Mote-Morris House is a historic house in Leesburg, Florida, United States. It was located at 1021 West Main Street. On December 27, 1974, it was added to the National Register of Historic Places. It was moved to 1195 West Magnolia Street on September 1, 1990. h

The City of Leesburg owns the house, and opens it for public tours twice a month. It is also available for rent for special occasions. As of February 20, 2018 the house suffered a devastating fire. The fire marshal ruled it to not be arson, however a witness told police multiple persons were seen inside the structure between two and three a.m. The damage was extensive.

History
Mote-Morris was built in 1892 by Leesburg's eight-term Mayor, Edward H. Mote, at a cost of $9,000. The house has two-storeys, with a single four-storey turret. The Mote family sold the house in 1908 to Bishop Henry Clay Morrison, and in 1918, it came into the possession of the Morris family, which resided there for the next 70 years.

Relocation
On 1 September 1990 the house was relocated to Magnolia Street, having previously stood on Main Street.

References
 Lake County listings at National Register of Historic Places
 Florida's Office of Cultural and Historical Programs
 Lake County listings
 Mote-Morris House

Notes

External links

Mote-Morris House - City of Leesburg

Houses on the National Register of Historic Places in Florida
National Register of Historic Places in Lake County, Florida
Historic house museums in Florida
Museums in Lake County, Florida
Houses in Lake County, Florida
Leesburg, Florida
Relocated buildings and structures in Florida
1892 establishments in Florida
Houses completed in 1892